Maria Drobot (born 21 March 1982, Rostov-on-Don) is a Russian political figure and a deputy of the 8th State Duma.
 
In 2008, Maria Drobot joined the Communist Party of the Russian Federation. She worked as an advisor to the deputy of the 5th and 6th State Dumas. From 2008 to 2018, she was the first secretary of the Rostov Regional Committee of the Lenin Komsomol. From 2015 to 2017, Drobot headed the department of the Central Committee of the Communist Party of the Russian Federation for organizational, party and personnel work. Since September 2021, she has served as deputy of the 8th State Duma.

References
 

 

1982 births
Living people
Communist Party of the Russian Federation members
21st-century Russian politicians
Eighth convocation members of the State Duma (Russian Federation)
21st-century Russian women politicians
Politicians from Rostov-on-Don
Russian individuals subject to United Kingdom sanctions